The German language satirical magazine Ulk was printed from 1872 until 1933 by the publisher Rudolf Mosse. Its headquarters was in Berlin, Germany.

Initially it was an independent weekly paper as Wochenblatt für Humor und Satire. It was a supplement to the Berliner Tageblatt and the Berliner Volks-Zeitung, both published by Mosse.

Contributors to the Ulk included Hans Reimann, Kurt Tucholsky, Lyonel Feininger, and Heinrich Zille.

References

External links
 Ulk. Illustriertes Wochenblatt für Humor und Satire – digital version at University Library Heidelberg

1872 establishments in Germany
1933 disestablishments in Germany
Defunct political magazines published in Germany
German-language magazines
Satirical magazines published in Germany
Weekly magazines published in Germany
Magazines established in 1872
Magazines disestablished in 1933
Magazines published in Berlin
Newspaper supplements